Acta Universitatis Szegediensis may refer to:
 Acta Biologica Szegediensis
 Acta Climatologica
 Acta Cybernetica
 Acta Juridica et Politica
 Acta Scientiarum Mathematicarum
 Analysis Mathematica
 Electronic Journal of Qualitative Theory of Differential Equations
 Tiscia, an Ecological Journal

University of Szeged